Iai may refer:
Purari language (New Guinea), also known as I'ai
Iaai language (New Caledonia)